Health Career Exploring, whose participants are called "Explorers," is one of the career-oriented programs offered by Learning for Life, a branch of the Boy Scouts of America.

Description
Health Career Exploring is a program for high school students who want to learn more about specific health careers and observe the workplace of various healthcare professionals. Explorers may attend monthly meetings where they can study health-related topics.

Explorers may study medical careers including the following, but not limited to:

Nurse
Physician
Pharmacist
Veterinarian
Physical Therapists
Psychologists / Psychiatrists
Sports medicine
Dentistry
Home Health Care Aide

See also
 Aviation Career Exploring
 Fire Service Exploring
 Law Enforcement Exploring

References

External links
Find An Explorer Post

Boy Scouts of America